Khanjani is a percussion musical instrument, a variety of Daf, found in West Bengal & Odisha.

References

Indian musical instruments